Buena Vista Township is a township in Clayton County, Iowa, United States.  As of the 2000 census, its population was 339.

History
Buena Vista Township is named from the Battle of Buena Vista in the Mexican–American War.

Geography
According to the USGS, it contains three cemeteries: Buena Vista, Immaculate Conception and North Buena Vista.

Dead Lake, Spring Lake and Wachendorf Lake are within this township. The streams of Picayune Chute and Turkey River run through this township.

Notes

References
 USGS Geographic Names Information System (GNIS)

External links
 US-Counties.com
 City-Data.com

Townships in Clayton County, Iowa
Townships in Iowa